"Mother Russia" is the closing song on Renaissance's 1974 album Turn of the Cards. It also appears on the 1976 live album Live at Carnegie Hall, the compilation Tales of 1001 Nights, Vol. 1, and several other Renaissance concert albums.

The song is a tribute to Russian fiction writer Aleksandr Solzhenitsyn, who had been forced by the USSR government to leave the Soviet Union earlier in 1974. Written as usual by poet Betty Thatcher, the lyrics are based on Solzhenitsyn's famous fiction novel about Soviet repression, One Day in the Life of Ivan Denisovich. Because fans of the band were surprised at the move into topical songwriting, singer Annie Haslam has had often to point out to interviewers that "Mother Russia" really refers to Solzhenitsyn.

Musically, the full version of "Mother Russia" begins with a sparse, string-driven introduction marked by occasional piano crescendos. Around two minutes into the song, Haslam's voice enters, and the next three minutes of the song contain six verses in three pairs describing Solzhenitsyn's plight, in between which are short interludes of strings and acoustic guitar.

The last five minutes of the full song consist of a three-minute instrumental interlude with the full band performing over wordless vocals by Haslam, followed by a repeat of the last two verses to finish. Recording engineer and co-producer Dick Plant stated:

I think that the real thrust of the music came from John Tout's piano. I don't think Renaissance ever wanted to do anything that they couldn't reproduce on stage.

The music to "Mother Russia" is credited to Michael Dunford, but the song is cited by Renaissance bassist Jon Camp as being a case where he made major compositional contributions without being credited for them; he claims authorship of the instrumental interlude.

Personnel
Renaissance
Annie Haslam – lead vocals
Michael Dunford – acoustic guitar
Jon Camp – bass, backing vocals
John Tout – keyboards
Terence Sullivan – drums, percussion

Additional personnel
Jimmy Horowitz – orchestral arrangements

Single
A version of "Mother Russia" edited down to three minutes and seven seconds was released as a single in the United States only. Although its parent album, Turn of the Cards, peaked at #94 on Billboard, the single did not go anywhere near the Billboard Hot 100.

References

1974 songs
Protest songs
Songs based on actual events
Song recordings produced by Richard Gottehrer
Songs about Russia
Songs about writers
Aleksandr Solzhenitsyn
Music based on novels
RCA Records singles
Sire Records singles